Floodgate Fund is a venture capital firm based in the United States created by Mike Maples Jr. and Ann Miura-Ko. It was originally named Maples Investments, but was renamed Floodgate Fund in March 2010. It is focused on investments in technology companies in Silicon Valley.

Investments

In March 2017, Floodgate raised $131 million for its sixth fund. In previous years, their fifth fund closed at $76 million, the fourth fund closed at $75 million and their third fund at $73.5 million.

Floodgate has invested in a number of companies including Twitter, Digg, location-based services company Gowalla, professional networking service BranchOut, Chegg, Formstack, Milk Inc., TaskRabbit, self-storage marketplace SpareFoot, and seasteading platform company Blueseed.

As of 2017, they've also invested in Lyft, Refinery29, LabDoor, education startup MissionU, legal discovery startup TextIQ,  Okta and Rappi.

Media coverage
Floodgate Fund and Mike Maples have been covered in TechCrunch and Forbes. Mike Maples of Floodgate was also interviewed about his investment philosophy by Sarah Lacy for TechCrunch TV.

References

External links
 

Financial services companies established in 2010
Venture capital firms of the United States
American companies established in 2010